The Clio Trestle is a railroad trestle on the historic Feather River Route of the Union Pacific Railroad. It is located in the Sierra Nevada near Clio in Plumas County, California.

History

The Western Pacific Railroad (now part of the Union Pacific) built the Feather River Route across the Sierra Nevada in 1909 to complete a San Francisco Bay Area–Salt Lake City route, competing with the Southern Pacific Railroad's line over Donner Pass. However the river's many tributaries running through narrow canyons necessitated the construction of some fixed spans. The Clio Trestle is the longest and tallest bridge along the route.

The bridge appears in the 1960 film Guns of the Timberland.

Railfanning
The Clio Trestle is a favorite railfan spot and is part of the Plumas County and Western Pacific Railroad Museum's  "7 Wonders of the Western Pacific Railroad World" exhibit and tour. History and railfan access are described in two travel guides. The trestle can be reached via Clio State Road 40A, either north  from State Highway 89 at Clio, or south  from State Highway 70.

See also
Western Pacific Railroad Museum — in Plumas County
Keddie Wye
Beckwourth Trail

References

External links
Western Pacific Railroad Museum website

Bridges in Plumas County, California
Railroad bridges in California
Western Pacific Railroad
Trestle bridges in the United States
Bridges completed in 1909
Union Pacific Railroad bridges